A.Yu. Krymskyi Institute of Oriental Studies is a research institute in Ukraine that is part of the National Academy of Sciences of Ukraine department of history, philosophy and law and studies languages, histories, philosophies, religions, and cultures of peoples of Asia, Near, Middle and Far East, Northern Africa, and ethnicities of oriental origin that have existed or live on the territory of Ukraine. The institute is located in Kyiv.

It is named after Ukrainian orientalist Ahatanhel Krymskyi.

Directors 
 1991 – 1996 Omeljan Pritsak, foreign member
 1999 – 2012 Lesia Matveyeva
 2012 – 2013 Danylo Radivilov
 2014 – 2021 Oleksandr Bogomolov
 2021 - present

Building
Beside the Institute of History of Ukraine, the building also houses two other research institutes of the National Academy of Sciences of Ukraine, the Shevchenko Institute of Literature and the Potebnya Institute of Linguistics.

During the events of Euromaidan in winter of 2014, near the building were erected the Hrushevsky Street barricades.

See also
 2014 Hrushevskoho Street riots

External links
 Official website
 Matveyeva, L., Shepel, L. ''Krymskyi Institute of Oriental Studies (Інститут сходознавства ім. А. Ю. Кримського). Encyclopedia of History of Ukraine.

Institutes of the National Academy of Sciences of Ukraine
1991 establishments in Ukraine
NASU department of history, philosophy and law
Research institutes in Kyiv
 
Hrushevsky Street (Kyiv)